Radu III of Wallachia, commonly called Radu the Handsome or Radu the Fair (January 1475), was the younger brother of Vlad III and prince of the principality of Wallachia. They were both sons of Vlad II Dracul and his wife, Princess Cneajna of Moldavia. In addition to Vlad III, Radu also had two older siblings, Mircea II and Vlad Călugărul, both of whom would also briefly rule Wallachia.

Life with the Ottomans

In 1436, Vlad II Dracul ascended to the throne of Wallachia. He was ousted in 1442 by rival factions in league with Hungary, but secured Ottoman support for his return by agreeing to pay tribute to the Sultan and also send his two legitimate sons, Vlad III and Radu, to the Ottoman court, to serve as hostages of his loyalty. Vlad and Radu were later educated in logic, the Quran and the Turkish and Persian language and literature. The boys' father, Vlad Dracul, with the support of the Ottomans, returned to Wallachia and took back his throne from Basarab II.

While Vlad was eventually released to take his place on the Wallachian throne in 1448 after his father was killed by John Hunyadi, Radu converted to Islam and was allowed into the Ottoman imperial court. Radu later participated alongside Mehmet II, now Sultan, in the Ottoman siege which eventually led to the Fall of Constantinople in 1453. Radu was allowed to live in the newly built Topkapı Palace in Istanbul. According to the Serbian Janissary Konstantin Mihailović Radu was a commander of the Janissary; in the campaign against his brother Vlad III, Radu was at the head of 4000 horsemen.

Byzantine chronicles
According to Latin translations of the Byzantine Greek chronicler Laonikos Chalkokondyles, Radu became an intimate friend and a favorite of Mehmed II, with whom he possibly, due to good looks, had an amorous relationship. In one tale recounted by Chalkokondyles, Radu is invited to Mehmed's bedchamber, but upon realising the sultan's amorous intentions, draws a knife and wounds Mehmed. Despite this incident, he became one of the sultan's favourites. In the beginning of the chronicle, it is noted that the incident happened when Mehmed first arose to the throne in 1451. Chalkokondyles wrote that the sultan, along with people of his nation, had the custom of using favorite boys, and spent "day and night together" with Radu.

Struggles for the rule of Wallachia

In November 1447, John Hunyadi launched an attack against Wallachia due to its alliance with the Ottomans by the treaties signed by Vlad II Dracul and his duplicity in Varna Campaign (1444). Radu's father fled, but Mircea II was captured by boyars from Târgoviște and was blinded with a red-hot poker before being buried alive. A short time after their father was captured and killed by the forces of John Hunyadi, Vlad III was released in 1448 and was the Ottoman Turks' candidate for the throne of Wallachia, the first of a succession of times he would hold the throne, this first time for only a matter of months.

Radu's brother Vlad III later went on to take the throne from Vladislav II in 1456 and began his second reign for which he was to become famous. Like his older brother Mircea II, Vlad III was an able military commander and now found himself opposing the Ottomans.

Radu, at the age of 22, became a leading figure at the Ottoman court. In 1461, Mehmed II began preparing to invade Wallachia. After consulting his astrologers, the thirty-year-old sultan resolved to personally lead the punitive expedition. His personal Janissary guard was larger than the entire army of Vlad III. Moreover, the sultan opted to reward Radu's ongoing loyalty by setting him on the throne of Wallachia in Vlad III's place.

In 1462, a massive Ottoman army marched against Wallachia, with Radu at the head of the Janissary. Vlad III retreated to Transylvania. During his departure, he practised a scorched earth policy, leaving nothing of importance to be used by the pursuing Ottoman army. When the Ottoman forces approached Târgoviște, they encountered over 20,000 of their kind impaled by the forces of Vlad III, creating a "forest" of dead or dying bodies on stakes. This atrocious, gut-wrenching sight was too much even for them to bear therefore they returned to Ottoman forces to regroup.

Vlad III waged a guerrilla campaign against the Ottoman forces commanded by the Grand Vizier Mahmud Pasha in May 1462, pursuing them in their retreat as far as the Danube. On 16 and 17 June, he again defeated a sizable Ottoman force in what has become known as The Night Attack, which resulted in heavy casualties to the Ottoman army, as well as logistical losses.

After Mehmed II suffered losses from The Night Attack, Radu and his loyalists campaigned on the Danubian plains for support to replace his brother. It was not difficult to convince them; he only had to promise the boyars that he would restore their privileges and assure the defectors from Vlad III's camp that they would not be punished. But above and beyond this, he preached of a lasting peace, a gentle reign, and no revenge for any past wrongdoings. Radu sent envoys to the Saxon cities hardest hit by Vlad III, tempting them with old-fashioned advantageous trade regulations and vouching for the sanctity of their families. His good nature attracted instant allies, including inhabitants of Bucharest and Târgoviște, who had enough of the cruelty of his brother.

Radu chased Vlad III to his castle north of Curtea de Argeș and, finally, out of Romania itself, which was incorporated under Ottoman control. Taking advantage of their fortune the Ottomans strengthened their commercial presence in the Danube against any Hungarian influence and intervention in the region.

Meanwhile, his brother Vlad III, due to his harsh policies towards the boyars (whose power struggles he blamed for the state of the realm), was betrayed by them. Vlad III travelled to Hungary to ask for help from his former ally, Matthias Corvinus. But instead of receiving help he found himself arrested and thrown into the dungeon over false charges of treason.

After the victorious campaign north of the Danube, the Ottomans placed the young Radu (then 26 years of age) as the Bey of Wallachia. Soon after, the Janissary under his command began attacks and raids on Vlad III's mountain stronghold on the Argeș River, Poenari Castle. During his reign the Ottoman Sipahi's gained a strong foothold in the south of the country.

In 7 March 1471, Radu fought the Battle of Soci against Stephen III, his future son-in-law, for possession of Chilia (now Kiliya in Ukraine). Slavo-Romanian chronicles relate that Stephen III had a "war with Radu voivode for Soci". Stephen III's relationships with Radu were hostile. He invaded Wallachia on several occasions during Radu's reign, dethroning him four times in response to Radu's vassalage.

In 1473, following an agreement with the Ottomans, Basarab Laiotă cel Bătrân (Basarab Laiotă the Old) took over the throne. Between 1473 and 1475 Radu briefly returned twice to the throne.

Personal life

Radu's wife was Maria Despina, considered to be a Serbian or Albanian princess. His daughter was Maria Voichița, who later married Prince Stephen III of Moldavia. He is estimated to have died between 1475 and 1477.

See also

 Mihnea Turcitul
 Ilie II Rareș

References

|-

External links

 
 Wallachian Rulers
 Wallachian Ruler Timeline

1437 births
1475 deaths
House of Drăculești
Rulers of Wallachia
Medieval LGBT people
Converts to Islam from Eastern Orthodoxy
Military personnel of the Ottoman Empire
Janissaries
15th-century Romanian people